An Echo in the Darkness (1994) is the second novel in the Mark of the Lion Series by Francine Rivers. It was awarded a RITA Award for best inspirational romance by the Romance Writers of America in 1995.

Synopsis 
The book begins where A Voice in the Wind left off, in the arena where Hadassah is thrown to the lions because her mistress was jealous of her purity. A young physician, Alexander, must choose one of the mauled bodies in the arena, so that he can examine it and further his knowledge as a physician. He chooses Hadassah's, only to discover that she is alive and that the lion has struck no vital organs. On a sudden impulse, Alexander saves Hadassah and nurses her back to health. Although she remains crippled, she regains the ability to walk and talk.

Meanwhile, Marcus Lucianus Valerian, believing that Hadassah is dead, tries to deal with his grief by traveling to Israel (Hadassah's homeland) and learning about Hadassah's God.

Throughout the book Hadassah's mistress, Julia Valerian contracts a fatal illness due to her sexual immoral and promiscuous behavior in her younger years, and slowly dies of a wasting disease. Hadassah, who had become Alexander's assistant, learns of her old mistress' bereavement and decides to move in with Julia and care for her until she dies. Hadassah covers her scars (and identity) with veils and heavy clothing.

As she leaves Alexander, he admits his feelings for her, but she knows that he is not who she was meant to be with, and admits that she really only loves him as a brother and dear friend. As Hadassah tries to bring spiritual salvation to Julia, she finds herself feeling sorry for her and ultimately forgives Julia completely for attempting to kill her. However, she is still scared that Julia may find out her true identity.

As Julia's life nears its end, her brother Marcus returns from Israel to manage her affairs. Though Marcus accepted Christ during the time he spent in Israel, he is still extremely bitter towards his sister and unwilling to forgive her for sending Hadassah to the lions. When it is clear that Julia is about to die, Hadassah reveals her true identity to her. She tells Julia that she has forgiven her long ago and that Christ has forgiven her as well. Julia  becomes a Christian and is reconciled to Hadassah. Hadassah had not realized that Marcus was listening in the whole time. He takes Julia to the garden to be baptized before she dies peacefully.  He then chases after Hadassah, who had fled back to Alexander's, fearing Marcus would think her scars were ugly and reject her.  Marcus finds Hadassah, grants her her freedom and the two are married. They have many children together and continue to do Christ's work as Christians are continually persecuted throughout the Empire.

References 

1994 American novels
Novels set in ancient Israel
Mark of the Lion Series